Feller's coin-tossing constants are a set of numerical constants which describe asymptotic probabilities that in n independent tosses of a fair coin, no run of k consecutive heads (or, equally, tails) appears.

William Feller showed that if this probability is written as p(n,k) then

where αk is the smallest positive real root of

and

Values of the constants

The exact probability p(n,2) can be calculated either by using Fibonacci numbers, p(n,2) =  or by solving a direct recurrence relation leading to the same result. The corresponding exact probabilities can be calculated as p(n,k) = .

Example
If we toss a fair coin ten times then the exact probability that no pair of heads come up in succession (i.e. n = 10 and k = 2) is p(10,2) =  = 0.140625. The approximation  gives 1.44721356...×1.23606797...−11 = 0.1406263...

References

External links
 Steve Finch's constants at Mathsoft

Mathematical constants
Gambling mathematics
Probability theorems